Pedicide, child murder, child manslaughter, or child homicide is the homicide of an individual who is a minor.

Punishment by jurisdiction

United States
In 2008, there were 1,494 child homicides in the United States. Of those killed, 1,035 were male and 452 were female.

Several U.S. states have included child murder to their list of aggravating factors that may make a murder punishable by the death penalty, but the victim’s age under which the crime is a capital crime varies between them. In 2011, Texas raised this age from six to ten.

Child manslaughter can result in an aggravated charge in some jurisdictions such as the State of Florida.

United Kingdom
Any murder in the United Kingdom carries a mandatory life sentence. In England and Wales, murder of a child involving sexual or sadistic conduct or abduction of the victim can result in a whole life order (i.e. life imprisonment without the possibility of parole) being imposed where the offender is at least 21 years old. Sentencing guidelines state that where the offender is under 21, the starting point is a minimum term of 30 years.

By other children

In most countries, there are very few cases where children are killed by other children. According to the U.S. Department of Justice statistics for 1996, one in five murders of children were committed by other children. Several murders by children have gained prominent media exposure. One was the killing on 12 February 1993 of the 2-year-old boy James Bulger by two 10-year-old boys in Bootle, Merseyside, UK. He was beaten and stoned before his unconscious body was left on train tracks to give the impression that a train had hit him. Bulger's killers became the youngest convicted murderers in the modern history of the United Kingdom. Another notable case in the UK occurred in 1968 in Newcastle upon Tyne, when 10-year-old Mary Bell was convicted of manslaughter due to diminished responsibility in the deaths of toddlers Martin Brown and Brian Howe. She was released in 1980 at the age of 23. In 1998, 8-year-old Madelyn Clifton was killed by 14-year-old Josh Phillips.

Media coverage

In 1992, after the fatal shooting of 7-year-old Dantrell Davis as he left the Cabrini–Green public housing project for school, the Chicago Tribune put every child murder on the front page (generally no murders were front-page news). 62 child murders were reported that year.

Multiple deaths in one incident, such as the 1999 Columbine High School massacre and the 2012 Sandy Hook Elementary School shooting, tend to gather the most media attention but are statistically scarce.

Genocide and child soldiers

The military use of children refers to children being placed in harm's way in military actions, in order to protect a location or provide propaganda. This is sometimes referred to as child sacrifice, though not equivalent to the religious variety. It may also refer to the use of children as child soldiers or saboteurs.

Red Hand Day on February 12 is an annual commemoration day to draw public attention to the practice of using children as soldiers in wars and armed conflicts.

"Muti killings"
Medicine murder (often referred to as muti killing) is a practice of human sacrifice and mutilation associated with traditional medicinal practices, such as Muti. Victims of muti killings are often children. Organs and/or body parts are usually taken while the child is still alive. An unknown child (referred to as Adam), whose decapitated torso was found in the River Thames in London in 2002 is believed to have been the victim of a muti killing.

Murdered children of royalty

Alexander IV of Macedon, 323–309 BC
Two sons of Queen Dowager Zhao of Qin and her lover Lao Ai, † 238 BC
Hieronymus of Syracuse, 231–214 BC
Caesarion, June 23, 47 BC – August 23, 30 BC
Julia Drusilla, summer of AD 39 – 24 January 41
Diadumenian, Roman co-emperor (May–June 218), September 14, 208 – June 218
Licinius II, Roman co-emperor (317-324), c. 315 – c. 326
Gisald (son of Sigismund of Burgundy), † 1 May 524
Gondebaud (son of Sigismund of Burgundy), † 1 May 524
Théodebald (son of Chlodomer), c. 521-531
Gunthaire (son of Chlodomer), c. 523-531
Tremorus of Brittany (son or stepson of Conomor) - Legendary (6th century AD)
Tiberius (son of East-Roman emperor Maurice), † 27 November 602
Petrus (son of East-Roman emperor Maurice), † 27 November 602
Paulus (son of East-Roman emperor Maurice), † 27 November 602
Justin (son of East-Roman emperor Maurice), † 27 November 602
Justinian (son of East-Roman emperor Maurice), † 27 November 602
Merovech (son of Theudebert II of Austrasia), † 612
Chilperic, king of Aquitaine, † 632
Tiberius, Byzantine co-emperor (706-711), 705 – December 711
Edward the Martyr, c. 962 – 18 March 978
Several sons of Harald Kesja, some of which might have been minor, were murdered in 1135
Harald (son of Sigurd Munn & Kristin Sigurdsdatter), killed in the 1160s before the age of majority 
Alexios II Komnenos, 14 September 1169 – September 1183
Emperor Antoku of Japan, December 22, 1178 – April 25, 1185
Vira Bahu I, King of Polonnaruwa, 1179 – 1196
Conradin, Duke of Swabia & King of Jerusalem, 25 March 1252 – 29 October 1268
Şehzade Halil, probably 1346 – 1362
Thong Lan, king of Ayutthaya, c. 1373/74 – c. 1388/89
Chang of Goryeo, September 6, 1381 – December 31, 1389
Yi Bang-Beon (son of Taejo of Joseon & Queen Sindeok), 1381 – October 6, 1398
Yi Bang-Seok (son of Taejo of Joseon & Queen Sindeok), 1382 – October 6, 1398
Danjong of Joseon, August 9, 1441 – December 24, 1457
Alexios V, Trapezuntine emperor, 1454 – November 1, 1463
Edward V of England, November 2, 1470 – c. 1483
Richard of Shrewsbury, Duke of York, August 17, 1473 – c. 1483
Lê Quang Trị, Emperor of Annam, 1509 – May 1516 (his two brothers was killed along with Quang Trị)
Feodor Godunov, 1589 – 10 or 20 June 1605
Louis XVII of France, March 27, 1785 – June 8, 1795
Jacques-Victor Henry, Prince Royal of Haiti, March 3, 1804 – October 18, 1820
Grand Duchess Anastasia Nikolaevna of Russia, June 18, 1901 – July 17, 1918
Tsarevich Alexei Nikolaevich of Russia, August 12, 1904 – July 17, 1918

See also
Amber Alert
Bloody Mary (folklore)
Cinderella effect
Kidnapping
Child abuse
List of murdered American children
Madam Koi Koi
Crime of Gádor

References

 
Killings by type